Gurnett is a surname. Notable people with the surname include:
Donald Gurnett {1940-2022), American physicist
George Gurnett ( 1792–1861), Canadian journalist and politician
Jane Gurnett (born 1957), English actress
Jim Gurnett (born 1949), Canadian politician
John W. Gurnett (1865–1920), American businessman and politician 
Terry Gurnett (born 1955), American soccer coach